This is a list of Sheriffs and, since 1998, High Sheriffs of Herefordshire

The position of Sheriff is the oldest secular office under the Crown. Formerly the Sheriff was the principal law enforcement officer in each county, but over the centuries most of the responsibilities associated with the post have been transferred elsewhere or are now defunct, so that the Sheriff's remaining functions are now largely ceremonial. Under the provisions of the Local Government Act 1972, on 1 April 1974 the office previously known as Sheriff was retitled High Sheriff. The High Sheriff changes every March.

Under the same act of 1972, Herefordshire and Worcestershire were merged to form the new county of Hereford and Worcester, and as a result the office of Sheriff of Herefordshire was replaced by that of High Sheriff of Hereford and Worcester. However, in 1998 the new county was dissolved, restoring Herefordshire and Worcestershire and creating the offices of High Sheriff of Herefordshire and High Sheriff of Worcestershire.

The Website of the High Sheriffs' Association of England and Wales stated in 2021 that the role was a "non-political Royal appointment", for one year, and unpaid.

Sheriffs

A nearly complete list of the High Sheriffs of Herefordshire from 1155 to 1647 can be found in The history of the worthies of England, Volume 1, pp. 83–94.

11th century
 Ralph de Bernai
 Bryning
 Ilbert fitz Turold
 c.1060 Osborne Fitzrichard Le Scrope

12th century
 c. 1127 - Pain fitzJohn
 1130 (maybe) Adam de Port
 1129 – 1135: Miles of Gloucester
 1136 - Pain fitzJohn
 1155–1160 (2 Henry II) - Walter de Hereford, for five years (son of Miles of Gloucester)
 1160–1169 (7 Henry II) - William de Bello Campo, for nine years
 1169 (16 Henry II) - William de Bello Campo and Walter Clicums
 1170 (17 Henry II) - Willielmus de la Lega
 1171 (18 Henry II) - Gilbertus Pypard
 1172 (19 Henry II) - Gilbertus Pypard
 1173 (20 Henry II) - Willielmus de Braiose
 1174 (21 Henry II) - Willielmus de Braiose
 1175 (22 Henry II) - Radulphus Pulcherus, for seven years
 1182 (29 Henry II) - Milo de Mucegros and Willielmus Torelle
 1183 (30 Henry II) - Willielmus Torelle
 1184 (31 Henry II) - Radulphus Arden
 1185 (32 Henry II) - Radulphus Arden
 1186 (33 Henry II) - Radulphus Arden
 1189 (1 Richard I): Radul. de Arden
 1190 (2 Richard I): Henry de Longo Campo
 1191 (3 Richard I): Willielmus de Braiosa
 1192 (4 Richard I): Willielmus de Braiosa
 1193 (5 Richard I): Henry de Longo Campo) and Willielmus de Braiosa
 1194 (6 Richard I): Roger. Fitz-Mauricis
 1195 (7 Richard I): Willielmus de Braiosa
 1196 (8 Richard I): Willielmus de Braiosa
 1197 (9 Richard I): Willielmus de Braiosa and Willielmus de Burchhull
 1198 (10 Richard I): Willielmus de Braiosa and Willielmus de Burchhull
 1199 (1 John): Walter II de Clifford

13th century

14th century

15th century

16th century

17th century

18th century

1800–1899

1900–1973

High Sheriff
 1974–1997 — See High Sheriff of Hereford and Worcester

1998 – date

References

 
High Shrievalties in England
People from Herefordshire
History of Herefordshire
Local government in Herefordshire
High Sheriffs